WSBB-FM (95.5 MHz) is a commercial radio station licensed to Doraville, Georgia, and serving Metro Atlanta.  It is owned by the Cox Media Group. WSBB-FM is simulcast with WSB, both airing a news/talk radio format. On the air, the stations are referred to as "95.5 WSB," only occasionally mentioning the FM station's call sign or the AM station's frequency.

The studios and offices are on West Peachtree Street NE in Atlanta, in the WSB-TV and Radio Group Building. The transmitter is on the WSB-FM broadcast tower in Edgewood, just east of Downtown Atlanta. WSBB-FM broadcasts in the HD Radio hybrid format.

History

Early years
The station first signed on the air on May 1, 1948, as WGAU-FM on 99.5 MHz in Athens, Georgia.  It broadcast at 3,600 watts, simulcasting sister station WGAU, still owned by Cox. In 1956, when Channel 11 (now WXIA-TV) came on the air in Atlanta, WGAU-FM created a second harmonic at 199.0, on top of the video carrier of WXIA-TV at 199.25. That caused interference for WXIA-TV, so WGAU-FM got permission from the Federal Communications Commission to move to 102.5 MHz. In 1962, WGAU-FM began broadcasting each day in stereo for six hours, the second station in Georgia to devote a significant part of its day to playing music in stereo. In 1962, WGAU-FM moved to 95.5 FM.

Country (1968-1999) 
In 1968, the station became WNGC, standing for "North Georgia Country". It was North Georgia's first full-time FM country music station and one of the first stand-alone FM country stations in the nation, not simply rebroadcasting a country AM station. WNGC went to a 24 hours a day schedule in 1976 and began broadcasting with an effective radiated power of 100,000 watts from the Neese Tower in Madison County.

Rhythmic (1999-2010)

In 1999, Clarke Broadcasting, long-time owner of WNGC and WGAU, wanted to sell its Athens properties. Cox Radio acquired the stations for $78 million.  Cox decided to flip WNGC to Top 40, briefly using the WYAP call letters before settling on WBTS, using the moniker "The Beat".

On September 25, 1999, the country format was dropped and the station began stunting with a loop of "Wild Thing" by Tone-Loc. When "The Beat" officially signed on September 27, its direction focused on mainstream pop, dance, and rock, even though it had a rhythmic lean. Under the direction of Program Director Dale O'Brian, it would drop all mainstream pop/rock and go rhythmic full-time. The rhythmic direction paid off in the Arbitron ratings, putting them among the top 10 stations in Atlanta. With this hip-hop bent, WBTS competed with WVEE and WHTA, while on the top-40 side it competed with WWWQ and WSTR. With the implementation of Portable People Meters in the Atlanta Arbitrons, WBTS had the second-most listened-to cume in the market behind WVEE.

In October 2005, the station switched its slogan from "Atlanta's New #1 Hit Music Station" to "Atlanta's New #1 for Hip Hop". Despite the shift, Cox was still billing the station as rhythmic top 40 (as the station still added rhythmic-friendly pop artists like Pink to its playlist) and continued to report to R&R's rhythmic reporting panel. Also in 2005, Cox received FCC approval to change WBTS's city of license from Athens, a city 40 miles from Atlanta, to Doraville, a suburb of Atlanta; the station's studios and transmitter did not move with that change.
In August 2006, the station tapped on-air personality Murph Dawg from WHZT, a Cox station in Greenville to host a new morning show with 6-year Atlanta veteran Stacy C, billing it as "Murph Dawg in the Morning with Stacy C". The alliance was short-lived, and after only a few months, Murph Dawg found himself solo. In May 2007, WBTS hired a member of WHTA's "The A-Team" morning show, CJ. The newly created morning show "Murph Dawg & CJ in the Morning" rose in the 18-34 demographics. In Spring 2008, WBTS hit its highest numbers in station history, with a 6.5 share in 18–34. "Murph Dawg & CJ in the Morning" hit 5th place, with later dayparts reaching the Top 2 and Top 3 ranks. In August 2008, WBTS again pulled a personality from across the street at WHTA, tapping overnight jock and mixer Mami Chula to fill the Night Show position that had been vacant since former night host Austin left in November 2007 for a gig in Indianapolis.

Other personalities that made up the WBTS weekday lineup included K-Dubb in middays, and Maverick in afternoons. Kenny Hamilton, Traci Steele, Johnny D, and Mo Reilley rounded-out the weekend lineup with DJ Kidd handling the primary mix show duties. The station program director was Cagle with Maverick as the assistant program director/music director.

In 2009, WBTS gained another competitor, as Clear Channel's WWVA-FM flipped from Spanish contemporary to rhythmic contemporary, becoming "105-7 the Groove". (WWVA-FM later hired Mami Chula for nights and Maverick for middays and programming duties after WBTS left the rhythmic format.)

News/talk (2010-present)
On August 16, 2010, Cox abruptly flipped WBTS to a simulcast of WSB. Cox Radio officials said that the move was necessary to keep WSB, long the dominant radio station in Atlanta, relevant to younger listeners who did not usually listen to AM radio. WBTS's DJs and sales staff were offered jobs at other stations in the Cox Atlanta cluster. The callsign was changed to WSBB-FM that October 1, a move made to adjust the callsign to parallel its AM parent (the heritage WSB-FM callsign remains at 98.5 FM).

On July 31, 2019, WSB and WSBB rebranded as "95.5 WSB". While AM 750 remains the primary signal, dall references to it were dropped aside from hourly legal station identification. WSBB-FM began broadcasting from its new transmitter location east of Atlanta on August 20, 2019. Besides a desire to reach younger listeners, WSBB-FM also serves to improve WSB's coverage in areas where the AM side's daytime signal has usually been weak. WSB's daytime coverage area is not nearly as large as that of other 50,000-watt AM stations due to Georgia's poor ground conductivity.

Programming
WSB's Scott Slade hosted Atlanta's Morning News until February 2023, when he stepped back from full-time hosting. Hosting is currently split among WSB news staff. AMN is followed by a local program hosted by Eric Von Haessler. Conservative talk show The Sean Hannity Show airs middays, syndicated via Premiere Networks (two hours of Hannity's program are tape delayed on late evenings). WSB personality Erick Erickson hosts the noontime slot held long-term by Rush Limbaugh, while WSB-TV morning traffic reporter Mark Arum hosts a local talk show in the afternoon drive. The local talk show Word on the Street (hosted by Shelley Wynter and MalaniKai Massey) airs in the early evening hours, while Brian Kilmeade (via Westwood One) and Dana Loesch air through the overnight hours. WSB/WSBB-FM also airs several weekend talk programs, including syndicated shows hosted by Kim Komando, Ric Edelman and Bill Handel.

WSB and WSBB-FM serve as the flagship radio stations for the University of Georgia Bulldog Radio Network, carrying all Bulldogs football and basketball games.

References

External links

Cox Media Group
News and talk radio stations in the United States
HD Radio stations
Radio stations established in 1948
SBB-FM
1948 establishments in Georgia (U.S. state)